Max Triebsch (born 22 July 1885, date of death unknown) was a German cyclist. He competed in three events at the 1908 Summer Olympics.

References

External links
 

1885 births
Year of death missing
German male cyclists
Olympic cyclists of Germany
Cyclists at the 1908 Summer Olympics
Place of birth missing
Cyclists from Berlin
20th-century German people